Gleisson Jorge de Souza Freire or simply Gleisson Freire  (born May 3, 1982 in Rio de Janeiro), is a Brazilian forward. He currently plays for Brazil team Rio Negro.
.

External links
 The database of player in ogol.com.br
 The database of player in footballdatabase.eu
 The database of player in theplayersagent.com
 A dialogue with the player and video to score two goals in the Malaysian league

1982 births
Living people
Brazilian footballers
Brazilian expatriate footballers
Association football midfielders
Salamanca F.C. footballers
Mesquita Futebol Clube players
Duque de Caxias Futebol Clube players
Al-Mina'a SC players
Ascenso MX players
Campeonato Brasileiro Série C players
Iraqi Premier League players
Expatriate footballers in Mexico
Expatriate footballers in Iraq
Brazilian expatriate sportspeople in Mexico
Brazilian expatriate sportspeople in Iraq
Footballers from Rio de Janeiro (city)